Antônio Carlos Coelho de Figueiredo Barbosa Júnior (born 16 March 1990), also known as Antônio Carlos Jr. and professionally by his ring name Cara de Sapato (as well as its English translation Shoeface), is a Brazilian mixed martial artist who competes in the Light Heavyweight division and is currently signed to the Professional Fighters League (PFL). Carlos Júnior is most known for his time spent fighting in the Ultimate Fighting Championship (UFC), where he competed in the Light Heavyweight division in addition to Middleweight. A multiple time champion in Brazilian Jiu-Jitsu, Carlos Júnior was World Cup Champion in 2006 (at blue junior) and 2x World Champion in 2010 (weight & absolute at brown belt). He is the winner of  The Ultimate Fighter: Brazil 3 Heavyweight tournament and the 2021 PFL Light Heavyweight Champion. In 2023, he was cast as contestant in the reality show Big Brother Brasil 23.

Mixed martial arts career

The Ultimate Fighter

On 26 February 2014 it was revealed that Carlos Júnior was selected to be a participant on The Ultimate Fighter: Brazil 3. Cara de Sapato defeated Guilherme Viana via TKO (punches) to move into the Ultimate Fighter house, and become an official cast member.

Carlos Júnior was selected as the first pick (second overall) of coach Wanderlei Silva to be a part of Team Wanderlei. In his second Heavyweight fight of the season, Cara de Sapato was selected to fight Edgard Castaldelli Filho and won via knockout (punch) with only twelve seconds of fight in the first round. He was then scheduled to face Marcos Rogério de Lima for a spot in the final against Vitor Miranda He defeated Lima by submission (rear-naked choke).

Ultimate Fighting Championship (2014–2021)

Carlos Júnior made his promotional debut on 31 May 2014, at The Ultimate Fighter Brazil 3 Finale against Vitor Miranda to determine the winner of The Ultimate Fighter: Brazil 3 Heavyweight Tournament. He won the fight via unanimous decision.

Carlos Júnior made his light heavyweight debut against Patrick Cummins on 20 December 2014, at UFC Fight Night: Machida vs. Dollaway. He lost the one-sided fight by unanimous decision. After the defeat, he decided to move to the middleweight division for his next fight.

Carlos Júnior faced Eddie Gordon in a middleweight bout on 27 June 2015 at UFC Fight Night 70  He won the fight via submission in the third round.

Carlos Júnior faced Kevin Casey on 10 December 2015 at UFC Fight Night 80. The bout was deemed a No Contest just 11 seconds into the first round when Carlos Júnior accidentally poked Casey in both eyes and Casey was unable to continue.

Carlos Júnior next faced Dan Kelly on 20 March 2016 at UFC Fight Night 85. He lost the bout via TKO in the third round.

Carlos Júnior returned to face Leonardo Augusto Guimarães on 17 September 2016 at UFC Fight Night 94. He won the fight via submission in the third round.

Carlos Júnior faced Marvin Vettori on 30 December 2016 at UFC 207. He won the fight by unanimous decision.

Carlos Júnior faced Eric Spicely on 3 June 2017, at UFC 212. He won the fight by submission due to a rear-naked choke in the second round.

Carlos Júnior faced Jack Marshman on 28 October 2017, at UFC Fight Night 119. Carlos won the fight by submission due to a rear-naked choke in round one.

Carlos Júnior faced Tim Boetsch on 14 April 2018, at UFC on Fox 29. He won the fight via a rear-naked choke in round one.

Carlos Júnior was expected to face Derek Brunson on 4 August 2018, at UFC 227. However, Brunson pulled out of the fight in early July citing an eye injury. In turn, Carlos Júnior was removed from the card entirely and is expected to be rescheduled for a future event. Subsequently, Carlos Júnior was quickly rescheduled was expected to face Elias Theodorou on 22 September 2018, at UFC Fight Night 137. However, Júnior pulled out on 28 August due to injury. The pairing was expected to be left intact and was rescheduled for 8 December 2018, at UFC 231. 
On 13 September 2018, it was reported that Carlos Júnior withdrew from his bout with Theodorou yet again, citing a surgery is required on the injury that caused the cancellation of his first scheduled bout with Theodorou.

Carlos Júnior faced Ian Heinisch at UFC Fight Night: dos Anjos vs. Lee on 18 May 2019. He lost the fight via unanimous decision.

Carlos Júnior faced Uriah Hall on 14 September 2019 at UFC on ESPN+ 16. He lost the fight via split decision.

Carlos Júnior was scheduled to face Brad Tavares on 14 March 2020 at UFC Fight Night 170. However, Tavares was forced to pull out of the fight due to an anterior cruciate ligament (ACL) injury, and he was replaced by Makhmud Muradov. In turn, Carlos Júnior suffered from an unspecified injury and the bout was cancelled from the event. The bout with Brad Tavares was rescheduled for 24 January 2021 at UFC 257. Carlos Júnior lost the fight via unanimous decision.

On 4 February 2021, it was announced that Carlos Júnior was released from his UFC contract.

Professional Fighters League

2021 Season 
On 6 March 2021, it was announced by Carlos Júnior's management that he had signed to the Professional Fighters League and would be competing in the 2021 season. He made his PFL debut against Tom Lawlor on 29 April 2021 at PFL 2. He won the bout via guillotine choke in the first round.

Carlos Júnior faced Vinny Magalhães at PFL 5 on 17 June 2021. Halfway through round one, Júnior hit Magalhães with an accidental knee to the groin, rendering him unable to continue. This led to the bout being declared a no contest.

Carlos Júnior faced Emiliano Sordi in the Semifinals off the Light Heavyweight tournament on 27 August 2021 at PFL 9. He won the bout via unanimous decision.

Carlos Júnior faced Marthin Hamlet in the Finals of the Light Heavyweight tournament on 27 October 2021 at PFL 10. He won the bout via rear-naked choke in the first round, winning the 2021 PFL Light Heavyweight Tournament and $1 million prize.

2022 Season 
Carlos Júnior faced Delan Monte on April 20, 2022, at PFL 1. He won 29 seconds into the bout via brabo choke.

Carlos Júnior faced Bruce Souto on June 17, 2022, at PFL 4. He won the bout via unanimous decision.

Carlos Júnior was scheduled to face Omari Akhmedov in the Semifinals off the Light Heavyweight tournament on August 5, 2022, at PFL 7. However, he suffered an ACL injury requiring surgery, sidelining him for the rest of the year.

Championships and accomplishments

Mixed martial arts
Ultimate Fighting Championship
The Ultimate Fighter: Brazil 3 Heavyweight Tournament Winner
Tied (with Thales Leites, Rousimar Palhares and Demian Maia) for second most submission victories in UFC Middleweight history (five)
'''Professional Fighters League
2021 PFL Light Heavyweight Championship

Brazilian jiu-jitsu 

 1st Place IBJJF Pan Championship (2012)
 1st Place CBJJ Brazilian Nationals (2012)
 2nd Place IBJJF Pan Championship (2012)

 1st Place IBJJF World Championship (2010 brown belt)
 1st Place CBJJ Brazilian Nationals (2011 / 2010 brown belt, 2009 /purple belt, 2008 blue belt)
 1st Place CBJJ Brazilian Nationals Juvenile (2007)
 1st Place IBJJF South American Championship (2008 purple belt, 2007 blue junior)
 1st Place IBJJF South American Championship Juvenile (2007)
 1st Place CBJJ Brazilian Team Nationals (2008 / 2007)

Mixed martial arts record

|-
|Win
|align=center|15–5 (2)
|Bruce Souto
|Decision (unanimous)
|PFL 4
|
|align=center|3
|align=center|5:00
|Atlanta, Georgia, United States
|
|-
|Win
|align=center|14–5 (2)
|Delan Monte
|Submission (brabo choke)
|PFL 1
|
|align=center|1
|align=center|0:29
|Arlington, Texas, United States
|
|-
|Win
|align=center|13–5 (2)
|Marthin Hamlet
|Submission (rear-naked choke)
|PFL 10 
|
|align=center|1
|align=center|3:49
|Hollywood, Florida, United States
|
|-
|Win
|align=center|12–5 (2)
|Emiliano Sordi
|Decision (unanimous)
|PFL 9 
|
|align=center|3
|align=center|5:00
|Hollywood, Florida, United States
|
|-
|NC
|align=center|11–5 (2)
|Vinny Magalhães
|No Contest (accidental groin strike)
|PFL 5 
|
|align=center|1
|align=center|2:45
|Atlantic City, New Jersey, United States
|
|-
|Win
|align=center|11–5 (1)
|Tom Lawlor
|Submission (guillotine choke)
|PFL 2
|
|align=center|1
|align=center|4:43
|Atlantic City, New Jersey, United States
|
|-
|Loss
|align=center|10–5 (1)
|Brad Tavares
|Decision (unanimous)
|UFC 257
|
|align=center|3
|align=center|5:00
|Abu Dhabi, United Arab Emirates
|
|-
|Loss
|align=center|10–4 (1)
|Uriah Hall
|Decision (split)
|UFC Fight Night: Cowboy vs. Gaethje 
|
|align=center|3
|align=center|5:00
|Vancouver, British Columbia, Canada
|
|-
|Loss
|align=center|10–3 (1)
|Ian Heinisch
|Decision (unanimous)
|UFC Fight Night: dos Anjos vs. Lee 
|
|align=center|3
|align=center|5:00
|Rochester, New York, United States
|
|-
|Win
|align=center|10–2 (1)
|Tim Boetsch
|Submission (rear-naked choke)
|UFC on Fox: Poirier vs. Gaethje
|
|align=center|1
|align=center|4:28
|Glendale, Arizona, United States
|
|-  
|Win
|align=center|9–2 (1)
|Jack Marshman
|Submission (rear-naked choke)
|UFC Fight Night: Brunson vs. Machida
|
|align=center|1
|align=center|4:30
|São Paulo, Brazil
|
|-
|Win
|align=center|8–2 (1)
|Eric Spicely
|Submission (rear-naked choke)
|UFC 212
|
|align=center|2
|align=center|3:49
|Rio de Janeiro, Brazil
|
|-
|Win
|align=center|7–2 (1)
|Marvin Vettori
|Decision (unanimous)
|UFC 207
|
|align=center|3
|align=center|5:00
|Las Vegas, Nevada, United States
| 
|-
|Win
|align=center|6–2 (1)
|Leonardo Augusto Guimarães
|Submission (rear-naked choke)
|UFC Fight Night: Poirier vs. Johnson
|
|align=center|3
|align=center|4:46
|Hidalgo, Texas, United States
|
|-
|Loss
|align=center|5–2 (1)
|Dan Kelly
|TKO (punches)
|UFC Fight Night: Hunt vs. Mir
|
|align=center|3
|align=center|1:36
|Brisbane, Australia
|
|-
|NC
|align=center|5–1 (1)
|Kevin Casey
|No Contest (accidental eye poke)
|UFC Fight Night: Namajunas vs. VanZant
|
|align=center|1
|align=center|0:11
|Las Vegas, Nevada, United States
|
|-
|Win
|align=center|5–1
|Eddie Gordon
|Submission (rear-naked choke)
|UFC Fight Night: Machida vs. Romero
|
|align=center|3
|align=center|4:37
|Hollywood, Florida, United States
|
|- 
|Loss 
|align=center| 4–1
|Patrick Cummins
|Decision (unanimous)
|UFC Fight Night: Machida vs. Dollaway 
|
|align=center|3
|align=center|5:00
|Barueri, Brazil
|
|-
|Win 
|align=center| 4–0
|Vitor Miranda
| Decision (unanimous)
|The Ultimate Fight Brazil 3 Finale: Miocic vs. Maldonado
|
|align=center| 3
|align=center| 5:00
|São Paulo, Brazil
|
|-
|Win
|align=center| 3–0
|Ednaldo Novaes
|Submission (armbar)
|Champion Fights 2
|
|align=center| 1
|align=center| 4:16
|Salvador, Brazil
|
|-
|Win
|align=center| 2–0
|Gerônimo Oliveira
|Submission (arm-triangle choke)
|Imperium: MMA Pro 6
|
|align=center| 1
|align=center| 1:41
|Feira de Santana, Brazil
|
|-
|Win
|align=center| 1–0
|Celivaldo da Silva
|Submission (arm-triangle choke)
|Nordeste MMA 1
|
|align=center| 1
|align=center| 1:02
|Salvador, Brazil
|
|-

Mixed martial arts exhibition record

|-
|Win
|align=center|3–0
|Marcos Rogério de Lima
|Submission (rear-naked choke)
|The Ultimate Fighter: Brazil 3
| (airdate)
|align=center|1
|align=center|3:22
|São Paulo, Brazil
|
|-
|Win
|align=center|2–0
|Edgard Castaldelli Filho
|KO (punch)
|The Ultimate Fighter: Brazil 3
| (airdate)
|align=center|1
|align=center|0:12
|São Paulo, Brazil
|
|-
|Win
|align=center|1–0
|Guilherme Viana
|TKO (punches)
|The Ultimate Fighter: Brazil 3
| (airdate)
|align=center|1
|align=center|2:32
|São Paulo, Brazil
|
|-

See also
 List of current PFL fighters
 List of male mixed martial artists

References

External links
 Antônio Carlos Júnior at PFL
 
 

1990 births
Living people
Brazilian male mixed martial artists
Brazilian practitioners of Brazilian jiu-jitsu
Brazilian Muay Thai practitioners
Heavyweight mixed martial artists
Light heavyweight mixed martial artists
Middleweight mixed martial artists
Mixed martial artists utilizing Muay Thai
Mixed martial artists utilizing Brazilian jiu-jitsu
People awarded a black belt in Brazilian jiu-jitsu
People from João Pessoa, Paraíba
Ultimate Fighting Championship male fighters
Sportspeople from Paraíba
Big Brother (franchise) contestants
Big Brother Brasil